Astemir Valeryevich Abazov (born 8 December 1996) is a Russian football player. He plays for FC Volga Ulyanovsk.

Club career
Abazov made his professional debut in the Russian Professional Football League for PFC Spartak Nalchik on 9 November 2014 in a game against FC Taganrog.

He made his Russian Football National League debut for FC Luch Vladivostok on 7 July 2019 in a game against FC Khimki.

References

External links
 
 
 
 Profile by FNL

1996 births
Sportspeople from Nalchik
Living people
Russian people of Abkhazian descent
Russian footballers
Association football defenders
PFC Spartak Nalchik players
FC Angusht Nazran players
FC Urozhay Krasnodar players
FC Luch Vladivostok players
FC KAMAZ Naberezhnye Chelny players
FC Volga Ulyanovsk players
Russian First League players
Russian Second League players